Nothing Is True and Everything Is Possible: The Surreal Heart of the New Russia is a 2014 book by Peter Pomerantsev about 21st century Russian history.

Background
Miriam Elder of The New York Times wrote that the "prism" that Pomerantsev perceived the subject was through his previous career in reality television to imply the lack of authenticity of Russian institutions.

Work
The author recounts his experiences in Russia when he worked there in the reality television field in the 2000s. Elder describes the work as "Part reportage and part memoir". The author also includes stories of various figures who succeeded or faced hardships in that time period.

Pomerantsev only occasionally explicitly mentions the name of Vladimir Putin. Elder argued that this strategy "can be taken as a suggestion that we focus too much on him, that he’s so big he no longer requires discussion — or that we do not and cannot ever know who he truly is, so why even bother?"

Tony Wood of The Guardian wrote that the book shows that the "roots" of the psychological order was "the tumult and delirium of the country’s post-Soviet transformations".

Reception 
Megan McDonogh of the Washington Post wrote that the work is "gripping and unsettling".

See also 
 This Is Not Propaganda, 2019 book by the author

References

Further reading

External links 
 

2014 non-fiction books
English-language books
PublicAffairs books
Books about Russia